Világszabadság ('World Freedom') was a weekly newspaper published from Budapest, Hungary from 1897 to August 3, 1919. It was linked to the Social Democratic Party of Hungary and was a key mouthpiece of the agrarian-socialist movement. It was the organ of the Magyarországi Földmunkások Országos Szövetségébe ('National Farm Workers Union of Hungary'). The newspaper was set up as a continuation of Földművelők Lapja. Sándor Csizmadia was the founding editor of the newspaper. Between 1899 and 1905 it was published irregularly.

See also
Der Feldarbeiter
Weltfreiheit

References

1897 establishments in Hungary
1919 disestablishments
Socialist newspapers
Newspapers published in Budapest
Hungarian-language newspapers